A list of notable bands that are considered to be experimental rock or any experimental genre.



# 

1 Mile North
120 Days

A 

AMM (group)
Acid Mother's Gong
Adam Forkner
Aidan Baker
Air Liquide (band)
Alarm Will Sound
Alex Machacek
Animal Collective
Anja Garbarek
Anthony Moore
Antipop Consortium
Apache Beat
Apse
Armen Nalbandian
Autobody
Autopsia
Avey Tare & Kría Brekkan

B 

Battles (band)
Beach House
Beaten by Them
Beck
Benevento/Russo Duo
Birchville Cat Motel
Björk
The Black Angels
Black Dice
Black Flag
Black Moth Super Rainbow
Blonde Redhead
Blood Axis
Boards of Canada
Bowery Electric
David Bowie
Brand New
Broken Social Scene
Buck 65
Butthole Surfers

C 

Captain Beefheart
CEvin Key
CLOUDDEAD
Capitol K
Caroline K
Caspian
The Chariot (band)
Charming Hostess
Chevron
Chrome Hoof
Cindytalk
Circa Survive
Circle Takes the Square
Cloud Cult
Cluster (band)
Coil
Colleen
Crime in Choir
Crystal Castles (band)
Current 93
Cyclobe

D 

Daedelus
Death Grips

E 

Experimental Sonic Machines (solo)
Emerald Suspension